Son of Man is a 1980 South Korean film directed by Yu Hyun-mok. It is based on the same titled 1979 novel written by Yi Munyol.

Synopsis
A detective searching for the cause of a young man's death uncovers a melodramatic story involving prostitutes and religion.

Cast
 Hah Myung-joong
 Lee Soon-jae
 Joo Sun-tae
 Oh Su-mi
 Oh Mi-yeon
 Kim Yun-mi
 Hwang Jung-seun
 Do Kum-bong
 Park Am
 Kim Seok-hun

Awards
 Grand Bell Awards (1980), Best Film

Notes

Bibliography
 
 

1980 films
1980s Korean-language films
South Korean drama films
Best Picture Grand Bell Award winners
Films directed by Yu Hyun-mok